Anonymous (stylised in all caps) is the fourth studio album by American singer Blackbear. It was released on April 26, 2019, by Beartrap, Alamo Records and Interscope Records. Five singles have been released in support of the album: "1 Sided Love", "High1x", "Swear to God", "Hate My Guts" and "Dead to Me".

Track listing 
Adapted from iTunes.

Notes

 All titles are capitalised, eg. "High1x" is stylised as "HIGH1X"
Track 18 is a remake of blackbear's popular 2013 single of the same name.

Charts

References 

2019 albums
Blackbear (musician) albums
Interscope Records albums